Anu Lama (Nepali:अनु लामा) (born 3 October 1987) is a Nepalese women's footballer who currently is the captain for the Nepal women's national football team and a forward for APF Club. Lama is currently the second highest international goal-scorer in Nepal, with 35 total international goals to her name.

Personal life
Besides being a footballer Lama is also a member of the Armed Police Force, she along with Bhagwati Thapa, Laxmi Poudel and Usha Bhandari missed the first weeks of training for the 2014 SAFF Women's Championship because they had to go through the mandatory quarantine for the Ebola virus disease as the four had served in the U.N. mission in Liberia.

International career

Anu Lama made her debut for Nepal U-23 during the 2010 South Asian Games women's football tournament against Bangladesh. Lama performed well landing Nepal a silver medal overall after scoring against Sri Lanka (1-0), and a hat-trick against Pakistan (1-0, 4-0, 6-0).

During the same year, Lama was later called up for the senior team for the 2010 SAFF Women's Championship.
In a friendly match against Kuwait Lama scored four goals in an 8-0 victory. After the match Lama dedicated her four goals to all the Nepalese fans who had made the long trip to support the team.

International goals 

Scores and results list Nepal's goal tally first.

Career statistics

International

See also
Nepal women's national football team
Jamuna Gurung

References

‍‍

External links
महिला फुटबलकी पूर्वकप्तानको पूरा नभएको सपना - Kantipur Television

1987 births
Living people
People from Makwanpur District
Nepalese women's footballers
Nepal women's international footballers
Women's association football forwards
South Asian Games silver medalists for Nepal
South Asian Games medalists in football